The National Nordic Museum (previously Nordic Heritage Museum and then Nordic Museum) is a museum in the Ballard neighborhood of Seattle, Washington, United States, dedicated to the Nordic history, art, culture, and the heritage of the area's Nordic immigrants. It was founded in 1980 as the Nordic Heritage Museum, moved into a permanent, purpose-built facility in 2018 named the Nordic Museum, and was designated as the National Nordic Museum in 2019. The museum serves as a community gathering place and shares Nordic culture by exhibiting art and objects, preserving collections, and providing educational and cultural experiences from Danish, Finnish, Icelandic, Norwegian and Swedish Americans. The geographical region covered by the Museum includes entire Nordic region (Denmark, Finland, Iceland, Norway, Sweden, Estonia, the regions of the Faroe Islands, Greenland, and Åland, and the cultural region of Sápmi).

Description
The museum was originally known as the 'Nordic Heritage Museum' and was located in a red brick building in a predominantly residential part of Ballard.  This building had housed the Daniel Webster Elementary School from 1907 to 1979, at which time low student enrollment led to its closure.  In 2018, the museum was renamed the 'Nordic Museum' and moved into a new  building on NW Market Street in Ballard. This building, commissioned by the Museum, opened May 5, 2018, and was dedicated by Icelandic president Guðni Th. Jóhannesson and Danish crown princess Mary.

The non-profit museum's mission is to share "Nordic culture with people of all ages and backgrounds by exhibiting art and objects, preserving collections, providing educational and cultural experiences, and serving as a community gathering place." The founder and long-time director Marianne Forssblad retired in 2007. Eric Nelson followed her as executive director and Janet Rauscher became chief curator in 2008. In 2012, Lizette Gradén became the chief curator. In September 2019, Leslie Anne Anderson became director of collections, exhibitions, and programs. She oversees the curatorial department.

The museum published the NHM Historical Journal on a quarterly basis until 2011. In 2013 the museum published its first edition of the annual magazine Nordic Kultur.

The museum has also published books including Voices of Ballard and Beyond: Stories of Immigrants and Their Descendants in the Pacific Northwest published in 2012.

The Nordic Museum contains a Cultural Resource Center, that includes the Walter Johnson Memorial Library which was founded in 1980.  As of 2011 it held 15500 books. It specializes in books published in Danish, Finnish, Icelandic, Norwegian, and Swedish. Its special collection includes the Gordon Tracie Music Collection and the Vanishing Generations Oral History Project. The Gordon Ekvall Tracie Music Collection (formerly the Gordon Ekvall Tracie Music Library) was founded in 1995. As of 2011 it contained 3000 audio/visual materials, 4000 music scores, 2500 books, and 40 periodical subscriptions. It focuses on folk customs, traditional dance, traditional music, folk art, and folk attire for Nordic cultures. Its special collections include the Gordon Ekvall Tracie Music Collection, the Nordiska Folkdancers Collection, and the Skandia Folkdance Society Collection.

The museum was designated as the National Nordic Museum in March 2019 by the U.S. Congress as part of the John D. Dingell, Jr. Conservation, Management, and Recreation Act. The new name was dedicated by senators Maria Cantwell and Lisa Murkowski the following month.

Exhibitions

Nordic Heritage Museum

As part of the long term exhibits, the old Nordic Heritage Museum had five ethnic galleries, one for each country, Denmark, Finland, Iceland, Norway and Sweden, as well a gallery, "Dream of America", describing Nordic emigration to the Pacific Northwest. There was also a temporary gallery space.

Dream of America
Folk Art Galleries
Fishing Gallery
Logging Gallery
Iceland Room
Norway Room
Denmark Room
Finland Room
Sweden Room

National Nordic Museum

The permanent exhibit has been reconceived as a single exhibit, "Nordic Journeys", spread over five galleries. Besides artifacts from the  museum's permanent collection, over 100 objects are on extended loan from other museums in the U.S. and national museums of the five Nordic countries. The exhibit ranges from 4,000-year-old stone axes and Viking-era artifacts to examples of modern Nordic design.

Public programs
A large part of the museum's focus is offering programming to educate the public about Scandinavian culture, including a craft school, adult and kids programs and teacher resources.

Folk School
Nordic Knitting Café
Nordic Woodcarving
Rosemaling
Nordic Cooking
Adult Programs
 Tours
 Language Classes
 Nordic American Voices
Kids & Parents
 Craft Projects
 Kids’ Corner
 Music for Kids
Teachers
 Outreach Trunks
 Nordic Adventures
 Tour Materials

Events
The museum holds frequent events that further its mission of creating a community gathering space and educating the public about Nordic culture and heritage, including:
 Concerts, such as the Mostly Nordic Chamber Music Series and Smörgåsbord (18th season in 2013)
 Films
 Lectures
 Exhibition openings and artist tours

Special events
Each year the National Nordic Museum hosts two major community events, Nordic Sól and Julefest.

Nordic Sól began in 1984 as Tivoli Days and was held each July. In 2008 the two-day event's name was changed to Viking Days and in 2011 the event moved to mid-August. In 2018, the event moved back to July to coincide with the annual Ballard SeafoodFest. The event features food and craft vendors, Scandinavian music, and a Viking Encampment. In 2019, the museum renamed Viking Days to Nordic Sól and redesigned it to highlight more aspects of Nordic history and contemporary culture. 

Julefest is held the Saturday and Sunday before Thanksgiving each year. This event is a Nordic Christmas celebration with craft vendors, Nordic food and music, and Christmas traditions on display. The 2019 Julefest was the 42nd occurrence of this festival.

References

External links

1980 establishments in Washington (state)
Ballard, Seattle
Danish-American history
Ethnic museums in Washington (state)
European-American museums
Finnish-American culture in Washington (state)
History museums in Washington (state)
Human migration
Icelandic-American history
Libraries in Seattle
Museums established in 1980
Museums in Seattle
Norwegian migration to North America
Norwegian-American culture in Washington (state)
Sámi-American history
Scandinavian history
Scandinavian-American culture
Swedish-American culture in Washington (state)